In mathematics,  Jacob's ladder is a surface with infinite genus and two ends. It was  named after Jacob's ladder by Étienne ,  because the surface can be constructed as the boundary of a ladder that is infinitely long in both directions.

See also

Cantor tree surface
Loch Ness monster surface

References

Surfaces